Cheilosia uviformis is a Palearctic hoverfly.
It is found in Fennoscandia south to the Pyrenees and from Ireland eastwards through Central Europe to Yugoslavia.

Determination
External imagesCheilosia uviformis is closely related to several species  in theCheilosia proxima group and difficult to identify.

References

Diptera of Europe
Eristalinae
Insects described in 1894